Joaquín Andrés Moso Hernández (born 7 September 1978) is a Spanish retired footballer who played as a goalkeeper.

Club career
Born in Zaragoza, Aragon, Moso spent several seasons with local Real Zaragoza, but was almost exclusively associated with the reserves during his seven-year spell, training occasionally with the first team. His professional input consisted of 93 Segunda División games with Gimnàstic de Tarragona, SD Eibar, Pontevedra CF and Hércules CF, being relegated with the first and the third clubs; in 2003–04 he was part of Albacete Balompié's La Liga squad, but appeared in no competitive matches.

After suffering relegation from Segunda División B with CD Sariñena at the end of the 2013–14 campaign, 36-year-old Moso signed with amateurs CD Caspe, also in his native region.

International career
Moso earned 13 caps for Spain at youth level. His only for the under-21 side arrived on 17 November 1998, in a 0–0 friendly draw against Italy in Benevento.

Honours
Spain U16
UEFA European Under-16 Championship: Runner-up 1995

References

External links

1978 births
Living people
Footballers from Zaragoza
Spanish footballers
Association football goalkeepers
Segunda División players
Segunda División B players
Tercera División players
Real Zaragoza B players
Gimnàstic de Tarragona footballers
Albacete Balompié players
SD Eibar footballers
Pontevedra CF footballers
Hércules CF players
CA Osasuna B players
CD Linares players
Spain youth international footballers
Spain under-21 international footballers